Johan Söderqvist (born 11 February 1966) is a Swedish film score composer. He has twice been nominated for the European Film Award for Best Composer for his film scores.

Personal life 
Johan Söderqvist was born in Täby, outside Stockholm in Sweden, he attended the Royal College of Music in Stockholm, studying composition and arranging.

Career 
Söderqvist was a keyboard player in many different jazz bands and folk music groups and has toured extensively around the world before concentrating his activities on composition for film, television, radio and theatre.

He wrote his first film score for Agnes Cecilia in 1991 and since then he has written numerous scores for film and television, including nine scores for films directed by the acclaimed Danish director Susanne Bier. Among those titles are the award-winning score for Brothers (2004), After the Wedding (2006) and Things We Lost in the Fire (2007), where he collaborated with Academy Award-winning composer Gustavo Santaolalla, and most recently the Best Foreign Language Oscar-winning In a Better World (2010). He composed an award-winning score for Tomas Alfredson's film Let the Right One In (2008) and the music to the Oscar-nominated Norwegian film Kon-Tiki (2012).

In 2005 and 2009, Söderqvist was nominated as Best Composer by the European Film Academy for his Brothers (2004) and Let the Right One In (2008) scores. The Brothers score was also awarded Best Film Music at Cannes as well as the 'Rencontres cinématographiques de Cannes' Award for Best Music in Film. Söderqvist was one of the main composers of 2016 video game Battlefield 1 and Battlefield V. He provided the score for the Norwegian film Amundsen, which was released in February 2019, and the US television miniseries Anatomy of a Scandal (2022).

References

External links
Official Johan Söderqvist website

1966 births
Swedish composers
Swedish male composers
Swedish film score composers
Male film score composers
Living people
Varèse Sarabande Records artists